The 2022 Russian Super Cup (Rus. 2022 Российский Суперкубок) was the 20th edition of the Russian Super Cup, an annual football match organised jointly by the Russian Football Union and the Russian Premier League. It was contested by the reigning champions of the Russian Cup and the Russian Premier League. The match featured FC Spartak Moscow, the champions of the 2021–22 Russian Cup, and FC Zenit Saint Petersburg, the winners of the 2021–22 Russian Premier League. It was played at Gazprom Arena in Saint Petersburg, Russia and Zenit won 4:0, its third consecutive title of Russian Super Cup.

Teams

Venue
Gazprom Arena in Saint Petersburg was hosted the match.

The venue selected was controversial, as the venue is supposed to be neutral and Gazprom Arena is the home stadium of Zenit. Spartak considered boycotting the match in protest, but ultimately decided to attend.

Match

Summary

Details

<onlyinclude>

Notes

References

External links

Russian Super Cup
2022–23 in Russian football
FC Zenit Saint Petersburg matches
FC Spartak Moscow matches
July 2022 sports events in Russia
Sports competitions in Saint Petersburg
Football in Saint Petersburg